
Kurt-Jürgen Freiherr von Lützow (7 August 1892 – 20 July 1961) was a German general during World War II and recipient of the Knight's Cross of the Iron Cross with Oak Leaves, awarded by Nazi Germany for successful military leadership.

Lützow was born near Marienwerder. He surrendered to the Red Army in the course of the Soviet 1944 Operation Bagration in an encirclement near Bobruisk. In Moscow on 29 June 1950, he was sentenced to 25 years in prison for war crimes. In January 1956, he was released from prison and repatriated.

Awards
 Iron Cross (1914) 2nd Class (29 September 1914) & 1st Class (16 March 1916)
 Clasp to the Iron Cross (1939) 2nd Class (14 September 1939) & 1st Class (13 October 1939)
 Knight's Cross of the Iron Cross with Oak Leaves
 Knight's Cross on 15 August 1940 as Oberst and commander of the Infanterie-Regiment 89
 37th Oak Leaves on 21 October 1941 as Oberst and commander of the Infanterie-Regiment 89

References

Citations

Bibliography

 
 
 

1892 births
1961 deaths
People from Kwidzyn
People from West Prussia
Lieutenant generals of the German Army (Wehrmacht)
Recipients of the Knight's Cross of the Iron Cross with Oak Leaves
Barons of Germany
Prussian Army personnel
German Army personnel of World War I
Recipients of the Military Merit Cross (Mecklenburg-Schwerin), 1st class
Recipients of the clasp to the Iron Cross, 1st class
German Army generals of World War II